Talmei Bilu (lit. Bilu Furrows) is a moshav in southern Israel. Located in the north-western Negev near Netivot and Rahat, it falls under the jurisdiction of Merhavim Regional Council.

History
The moshav was established in 1953 by immigrants from Kurdistan and Romania. Its name marked the 70th anniversary of the first Bilu arriving in the Land of Israel.

References

External links
Talmei Bilu Negev Information Centre

Kurdish-Jewish culture in Israel
Moshavim
Populated places established in 1953
Populated places in Southern District (Israel)
Romanian-Jewish culture in Israel
Hitahdut HaIkarim
1953 establishments in Israel